The South American section of the 2026 FIFA World Cup qualification will act as qualifiers for the 2026 FIFA World Cup to be held in Canada, the United States and Mexico for national teams who are members of South American Football Confederation (CONMEBOL). A total of  slots (6 direct slots and 1 inter-confederation play-off slot) in the final tournament are available for CONMEBOL teams.

Format
On 22 August 2022, the CONMEBOL sent a request to FIFA asking to keep the current qualification format that has been used since the 1998 FIFA World Cup Qualifications in South America. This was confirmed, with the first games of the qualifiers to be played in 2023.

Prior to the commencement of the qualification competition, Ecuador have been deducted 3 points for falsifying birth documents for Byron Castillo in the previous World Cup qualification cycle.

Entrants
All 10 national teams from CONMEBOL will enter qualification.

Standings

Matches

Matchday 1

Matchday 2

Matchday 3

Matchday 4

Matchday 5

Matchday 6

Matchday 7

Matchday 8

Matchday 9

Matchday 10

Matchday 11

Matchday 12

Matchday 13

Matchday 14

Matchday 15

Matchday 16

References 

Conmebol
2023 in South American football
2024 in South American football
2025 in South America
FIFA World Cup qualification (CONMEBOL)